Table manners are the cultural customs and rules of etiquette used while dining. As in other areas of North American etiquette, the rules governing appropriate table manners have changed over time and may differ depending on the setting (e.g. dining at home, at a restaurant, or with business colleagues).

History 

Table manners have an ancient and complex history, as each society has gradually evolved its system.  Today, many of the behaviors that take place at the dinner table are deeply rooted in history.

In Europe, the Cultural revolution in Italy starting with the renaissance. Italian poet Giovanni Della Casa advised in Galateo, his 1558 book on manners: "One should not comb his hair nor wash his hands in public... the exception to this is the washing of the hands when done before sitting down to dinner, for then it should be done in full sight of others, even if you do not need to wash them at all, so that whoever dips into the same bowl as you will be certain of your cleanliness."

Some other examples are:
Eat rolls or bread by tearing off small bite-size pieces and buttering only the piece you are preparing to eat. When ready for another piece, repeat the same process. (Desiderius Erasmus, 1532)
Engage in table conversation that is pleasant but entirely free of controversial subjects. (Thomas Twyne, 1576)
If you need something that you cannot reach easily, politely ask the person closest to the item you need to pass it to you. (Thomas Tusser, 1577)
Elbows on the table are acceptable only between courses, not while you are eating. Never chew with your mouth open or make loud noises when you eat. Although it is possible to talk with a small piece of food in your mouth, do not talk with your mouth full. If food gets caught between your teeth and you can't remove it with your tongue, leave the table and go to a mirror where you can remove the food from your teeth in private. (William Phiston, 1609)

Proper etiquette was a concern of leaders in the society of eighteenth-century America –– Benjamin Franklin's Poor Richard's Almanack, for instance, included comments on proper behavior. During the nineteenth century, hundreds of books on etiquette were published in the United States.

In the home 
Each household have a unique set of rules at the table, but despite cultural differences, there are some essential table manners most families share, including rules against picking one's teeth at the table and chewing with one's mouth open. Due to changing lifestyles, table manners are more casual than they were in the 1950s. For example, some commentators contend that the common prohibition against placing elbows on the table no longer applies. Today, many families eat fast food without silverware and eat meals in front of the television or in the car rather than following past norms of gathering the family at the dining table for a meal. Critics claim that these changes have led to fewer opportunities to learn table manners in the home.

Additionally, advancement of technology in recent years raises issues regarding smartphone use at the dining table. Opinions vary regarding whether the use of smartphones at the dining table is acceptable.

Offenses 
The convention of avoiding putting one's elbows on the table while eating arose from a time when tables were sufficiently rustic and unstable that leaning on them could cause loose planks to disrupt the meal. However, as time has changed, it has become more acceptable to put one's elbows on the table, but only between courses, not while eating.

The main reason to be quiet while eating is for safety. According to the National Safety Council, suffocation, especially on foods, was ranked fourth on a list of major causes of death in American homes.

In most places, it is inappropriate for someone to make disapproving or disrespectful opinion when presented with food. Likewise, blowing one's nose at the table is impertinent. In addition, slurping food is considered offensive and impolite.

Business related 
As business dealings can take place over a meal, table manners can be helpful while dining with clientele, co-workers, or subordinates – building rapport with a client, celebrating the accomplishments of a team, or simply hosting a discussion in a non-office setting all call for proper etiquette if dining is involved. It is deemed an essential enough behavioral skill that has suffered from a decline in naturally occurring generational inheritance to the effect that some schools have opened programs and classes centered around dining etiquette to educate students in the practice. Inappropriate table manners can affect the opinion of those involved, as well as the outcome of the meeting.

Many appropriate mannerisms from formal dining situations can be applied in a business setting, though variations exist depending on who is the host and who is the guest, and the relation the one has with the other. Speaking while still chewing or mid-bite may be acceptable in an informal lunch setting with often-seen coworkers, but in a high-stakes meeting with a potential customer, it will likely to be viewed as impolite. Napkins are intended to be kept in the lap. The exception is when leaving the table temporarily – placed on the chair signals the staff that the diner's meal is unfinished, placed on the table near the plate shows the patron has completed their meal.

Unless the host offers to pay the inevitable bill, it should be assumed that each diner is responsible for their own bill, and the staff (and table) should be made aware of this at the appropriate time. The former being the case typically does not mean that the most expensive item on the menu should be sought out.

The dress code for a business related dining event can vary, usually around when the event takes place. The lunch period will likely find participants wearing what they wore to work, though special events may require a more scene-suitable dress. It is important to understand and attempt to match the formality of the event – this type of table manners begin prior to sitting down at the table.

Restaurant 
The level of formality can vary depending on the formality of the restaurant.

Proper table manners ought to begin as soon as one arrives at a table. The very first step after sitting down is place the napkin in one's lap. If the napkin is cloth, it should not be entirely unfolded and one crease should be left in placing it on the lap. With the napkin placed on the lap, it protects clothing from spills or food that may fall into the diner's lap.

It is important to be able to navigate the table setting, not only knowing which utensils to use, but which items are meant for whose use. A general rule of thumb for selecting the proper spoon or fork when provided with multiple is to start on the outside and work your way in. For example, if you are starting with a salad course and you have two forks to choose from, the fork farthest from the plate should be used, leaving the closer one for the main course.  Similarly, if you start with soup, select the spoon that is farthest from the plate.

Many restaurants set the table with a bread plate and water glass at each seat before patrons arrive. The bread plate goes to the left of the plate, and the beverage to the right. To avoid drinking from the wrong glass or taking a bite of your neighbor's bread, use the following trick if you forget which is yours:Touch both your index fingers to your thumbs. On your left, you will see a lowercase b, which stands for the bread plate. On your right is a lowercase d for Drinks. Dining in North America is widely viewed as a social occasion, rather than simply meet the requirement of biological needs. As such, one proper mannerism to show the people dining with you that you respect them and their time is to ignore the cell phone while dining. According to a study done by the Pew Research Center, 38% percent of people think it is acceptable to use cell phones in restaurants, and that number gets even smaller depending on the occasion. 12% of people think it is OK to use cell phones at family dinners, and only 5% think it is appropriate during meetings.

When it comes to paying the bill in American restaurants, adding a tip is a common custom that is often expected by the waiter.  According to a study by CreditCards.com, 4 out of 5 Americans always leave a tip when dining out, and the average tip is 16%–20% of the total bill.

References 

Dining etiquette
Etiquette by region
North American cuisine